March Comes In like a Lion is an anime television series animated by Shaft, adapted from the manga series of the same name written and illustrated by Chica Umino. It features the life of Rei Kiriyama, an introvert and professional shogi player, who gradually develops both his play and his relationship with others. The first season aired between October 8, 2016, and March 18, 2017, on NHK G for a total of 22 episodes. The second season aired between October 14, 2017, and March 31, 2018, for a total of 22 episodes. Both seasons are licensed in North America by Aniplex of America and streamed by Crunchyroll, while Anime Limited has licensed the first season in the United Kingdom.

In the first season, the first opening and ending theme songs are "Answer" and "Fighter" by Bump of Chicken, respectively. The second opening theme song is "Goodbye Bystander" by Yuki and the second ending theme song is "Orion" by Kenshi Yonezu.

The first season was directed by Kenjirou Okada and Akiyuki Shinbo, with Shinbo and Shaft (the latter as the collective name "Fuyashi Tou") taking on the role of series composition writers; while Yukito Kizawa, of Write Works, wrote the screenplay for the entirety of the series itself (sans a recap episode). Yukari Hashimoto composed the music for the series, and Nobuhiro Sugiyama (Shaft) designed the characters. Sugiyama served as chief animation director alongside Kazuya Shiotsuki (Shaft), and the two were helped out in episodes 2 and 3 by Manami Umeshita. 9-dan ranked shogi player Manabu Senzaki supervised the shogi. Five episodes were outsourced to Tezuka Productions: episodes 4, 6–7, 9, and 11.

The second season features most of the returning staff, including Okada, Shinbo, Shaft, Hashimoto, Kizawa, Sugiyama, Shiotsuki, and Senzaki. Episodes 7 and 10–22 of the second season also added Umeshita as a chief animation director once more. Eight episodes were outsourced to other studios: episodes 3, 10, 13, and 20 to Nomad; episodes 11 and 21 to Studio Elle; episode 16 to B.S.P; and episode 19 to Lapin Track.

Episode list

Season 1 (2016–2017)

Season 2 (2017–2018)

Notes

References

External links
  
  
 
 

March Comes in Like a Lion